Spartak Moscow may refer to the following teams based or formerly based in Moscow, Russia:
 FC Spartak Moscow, an association football club
 HC Spartak Moscow, a professional ice hockey team
 Spartak GM Moscow, a semi-professional rugby club
 WBC Spartak Noginsk, a women's basketball team previously known as WBC Spartak Moscow
 Spartak Moscow (bandy club), a bandy club, active 1910–1961
 FC Spartak Moscow (women)

See also
 Spartak (sports society)

 
Sports clubs in Moscow
Multi-sport clubs in Russia